is the first Japanese athlete to become an Olympic taekwondo medalist, winning the bronze medal at the Sydney 2000 Summer Olympics in the 57–67 kg weight class.

After beginning karate at age 12, she attended Waseda University in Tokyo.  She spent her junior year of college studying abroad in the United States at the University of Oregon, where she began learning Taekwondo.

Okamoto is a 1996 graduate of the Waseda School of Human Sciences, and currently works at Runes Kanazawa Co. Ltd.

Kickboxing record

|-  bgcolor="#FFBBBB"
| 1993-12-19 || Loss ||align=left| Lucia Rijker || K-2 Grand Prix '93 || Tokyo, Japan || TKO (right low kick) || 2 || 0:38 || 
|-
|-
| colspan=9 | Legend:

References

External links
 
 

1971 births
Living people
Japanese female taekwondo practitioners
Olympic taekwondo practitioners of Japan
Olympic bronze medalists for Japan
Sportspeople from Osaka Prefecture
People from Kadoma, Osaka
Japanese Christians
Taekwondo practitioners at the 2000 Summer Olympics
Taekwondo practitioners at the 2004 Summer Olympics
Taekwondo practitioners at the 2008 Summer Olympics
Olympic medalists in taekwondo
Asian Games medalists in taekwondo
Taekwondo practitioners at the 1998 Asian Games
Medalists at the 2000 Summer Olympics
Asian Games bronze medalists for Japan
Medalists at the 1998 Asian Games
Asian Taekwondo Championships medalists